The Tommy Murphy Cup was a Gaelic football competition, featuring senior county teams eliminated from the early stages of the All-Ireland Senior Football Championship and also Kilkenny when not fielding a team in the main All-Ireland. The series of games, organised by the Gaelic Athletic Association, were played during the summer months with the final being played in August at Croke Park. The Cup was named after Tommy Murphy, a footballer from County Laois who was, appropriately for the competition, the only member of the Team of the Millennium from a county which had not won an All-Ireland.

Later changes to the All-Ireland Senior Football Championship meant that the 2008 Tommy Murphy Cup featured the eight lowest-ranking teams in National Football League, unless the teams reached the final of their respective provincial championships. Antrim beat holders Wicklow in the final. The cup was cancelled after the 2008 tournament.

List of Finals

General statistics

Roll of honour

See also
All-Ireland Senior Football Championship
Tailteann Cup

References

 
2004 establishments in Ireland
Defunct Gaelic football competitions
Gaelic football cup competitions
Senior inter-county Gaelic football competitions